Samuel Houston Hill (November 20, 1898 – March 14, 1978) was an American football and basketball coach.

Early life
Hill was born in Ludlow, Illinois. He was the youngest of six children born to Harriet and William Hill.

Coaching career

Wichita State
Hill was the 14th head football coach for Fairmont College and the University of Wichita (now Wichita State University) located in Wichita, Kansas and he held that position for four seasons, from 1923 to 1924 and again from 1928 to 1929, compiling  a record of 14–4–5.  This ranks him ninth at Wichita State in terms of total wins and 14th at Wichita State in terms of winning percentage.  Fairmount College became the Municipal University of Wichita in 1926.

Wesleyan
Hill also served as the head football coach at Wesleyan University from 1925 to 1926, compiling a record of 5–10.

Later life and death
Hill was later director of labor relations for the truck division of General Motors. He moved from Royal Oak, Michigan to retire in Clearwater, Florida, where he lived for 12 years before dying on March 14, 1978.

Head coaching record

Football

References

1898 births
1978 deaths
American football halfbacks
General Motors former executives
Illinois Fighting Illini football players
Rollins Tars football coaches
Wesleyan Cardinals football coaches
Wichita State Shockers football coaches
Wichita State Shockers men's basketball coaches
People from Champaign County, Illinois
Coaches of American football from Illinois
Players of American football from Illinois
Basketball coaches from Illinois